Terry McGee (18 March 1945 – 31 October 2020) was an Australian rules footballer who played with South Melbourne in the Victorian Football League (VFL).

Notes

External links 

1945 births
Australian rules footballers from Victoria (Australia)
Sydney Swans players
2020 deaths